WKWI is a classic hits-formatted broadcast radio station licensed to Kilmarnock, Virginia, serving the Northern Neck and Middle Peninsula of Virginia.  WKWI is owned and operated by Two Rivers Communications, Inc.

References

External links
101-7 Bay FM Online

1975 establishments in Virginia
Classic hits radio stations in the United States
Radio stations established in 1975
KWI